Rolo Villar is an Argentine radio host.

Awards
 2014 Martín Fierro Awards: Best work in humor.

References

Argentine radio presenters
Argentine humorists
Living people
Year of birth missing (living people)
Place of birth missing (living people)